United Democratic Party may refer to:

United Democratic Party (Belize)
United Democratic Party (British Guiana)
United Democratic Party (Cayman Islands)
United Democratic Party (The Gambia)
United Democratic Party (Kenya)
United Democratic Party (Malaysia)
United Democratic Party (Meghalaya) (India)
United Democratic Party (Myanmar)
United Democratic Party (Namibia)
United Democratic Party (Nepal)
United Democratic Party (Marshall Islands)
United Democratic Party (Solomon Islands)
United Democratic Party (South Korea, 1995)
United Democratic Party, the former name of the Democratic Party (South Korea, 2008)
United Democratic Party (Tanzania)

See also
Democratic Party (disambiguation)

Political party disambiguation pages